Listed below are the dates and results for the 1994 FIFA World Cup qualification rounds for the Oceanian zone (OFC). For an overview of the qualification rounds, see the article 1994 FIFA World Cup qualification.

A total of seven teams entered the competition. However, Western Samoa withdrew. The Oceanian zone was allocated 0.25 places (out of 24) in the final tournament.

Format
There would be two rounds of play:
First round: The six teams were divided into two groups of three teams each. The three teams would play against each other on a home-and-away basis. The group winners would advance to the final round.
Final round: The two teams would play against each other on a home-and-away basis. The winner would advance to the CONCACAF–OFC intercontinental play-off.

First round

Group A

Australia advanced to the final round.

Group B

New Zealand advanced to the final round.

Second round

|}

Inter-confederation play-offs

First round

The winning team of the OFC qualification tournament will play CONCACAF group runners-up in a home-and-away play-off. The winner of this play-off qualifies for the 2nd play-off.

Second round

The winning team of the 1st play-off will play CONMEBOL Group 1 runners-up in a home-and-away play-off. The winner of this play-off qualifies for the 1994 FIFA World Cup.

Goalscorers

5 goals

 Carl Veart

4 goals

 Darren McClennan

3 goals

 Mehmet Duraković
 Bakalevu Moceimereke
 Tony Laus

2 goals

 Aurelio Vidmar
 Paul Wade
 Radike Nawasu
 Danny Halligan
 Michael McGarry
 Billy Wright
 Hollies Vato
 Maheanum Gatien

1 goal

 Graham Arnold
 Greg Brown
 Frank Farina
 Aytec Genç
 Ian Gray
 Tom McCulloch
 Damian Mori
 Ned Zelić
 Kaliova Bulinaceva
 Rodger Gray
 Robert Ironside
 Charles Ashley
 Duddley Hatei
 Batram Suri
 Eric Etaeta
 Jean-Luc Rousseau
 Reynald Temarii
 Charles Vatú

1 own goal

 Alex Tobin (playing against Argentina)

External links

 
qual
OFC

FIFA World Cup qualification (OFC)